Terry Alan Mathews (October 5, 1964February 24, 2012) was an American professional baseball player who pitched in Major League Baseball (MLB) from  to . He played for the Texas Rangers, Florida Marlins, Baltimore Orioles, and Kansas City Royals. 

Mathews pitched in college at the University of Louisiana at Monroe (formerly Northeast Louisiana University).

He had a 3.38 earned run average (ERA) in 57 appearances as the Marlins' setup man in 1995. After being replaced in the role by Jay Powell and with a 4.91 ERA in 57 games in 1996, he was acquired by the Orioles from the Marlins on August 21 of that year in a transaction that was completed two days later on August 23 when Gregg Zaun was sent to Florida.

Mathews was married with his wife Emily and they had three children, two of whom play baseball/softball. He was a school resource officer at his alma mater, Holy Savior Menard Central High School in Alexandria, Louisiana, and had also been a volunteer baseball coach there.

Mathews died from a heart attack on February 24, 2012, at the age of 47.

References

External links

1964 births
2012 deaths
American expatriate baseball players in Canada
Baltimore Orioles players
Baseball players from Louisiana
Bowie Baysox players
Edmonton Trappers players
Florida Marlins players
Charlotte Knights players
Gastonia Rangers players
Gulf Coast Royals players
Holy Savior Menard Central High School alumni
Jackson Generals (Texas League) players
Kansas City Royals players
Louisiana–Monroe Warhawks baseball players
Major League Baseball pitchers
Oklahoma City 89ers players
Oklahoma RedHawks players
Omaha Golden Spikes players
Charlotte Rangers players
Rochester Red Wings players
Sportspeople from Alexandria, Louisiana
Texas Rangers players
Tucson Toros players
Tulsa Drillers players
Wichita Wranglers players